A participatory organization is an organization which is built based on public participation rather than their contract obligations.

Types
Different types of participatory organizations are possible including production companies, membership organizations (such as trade unions), and co-operatives. They can be legally registered formal organizations or they may object to state regulation and be considered an informal organization.

Participatory organizations can have different levels of participation, ranging from complete economic transparency, to participatory management, and ultimately labor management.

Criticism
Participatory organizations are negatively affected by the free-rider problem, can be inefficient, and lack clear leadership and strategy.

See also
 Gift economy
 Human-based genetic algorithm
 Public participation
 Reciprocity
 Stigmergy
 Voluntary association

References

Types of organization
Organizational theory